The 2016 IAAF World Race Walking Team Championships was the 27th edition of the global team racewalking competition organised by the International Association of Athletics Federations. It was held in Rome, Italy from 7 to 8 May 2016. It was the first edition of the tournament under its new name, having previously been known as the IAAF World Race Walking Cup since 1989.

Overview
The programme remained unchanged, with senior men's races over 20 km and 50 km, a 20 km senior women's race, and junior category events for both sexes over 10 km. However, following the approval by the IAAF of the women's 50 km walk as an official event, for the first time women were permitted to enter the 50 km. A separate women's 50 km was not scheduled, but women were allowed to enter the men's event and were treated as equal competitors for team scoring.

The local organising committee was headed by Alfio Giomi, the head of the Italian Athletics Federation, and included Maurizio Damilano, a former Olympic champion in racewalking. The competition was organised at relatively short notice – Cheboksary was originally chosen as the host city but the suspension of the All-Russia Athletic Federation for systemic doping issues by the IAAF meant the host bidding was reopened. Rome was the clear winner in the bidding process in January 2016, with nine votes compared to Guayaquil and Kyiv's four and two for Monterrey. It was the fourth time that the competition was held in Italy, with previous editions having visited the country in 1963, 1965 and 2002.

The course was set on the streets of Rome around the Baths of Caracalla. It was a flat looped route, with one loop for the junior races and two for the senior races. The start point was beside the Arch of Constantine and the Colosseum and finishing point was the Stadio delle Terme di Caracalla.

Chinese athletes won both the junior races: Ma Zhenxia took the women's title and Zhang Jun the men's.

The competition was broadcast on television in the host country by Rai Sport 1 and Rai Sport 2.

In June 2016, the Italian sports newspaper La Gazzetta dello Sport, reported that gold medalist in the 50 km men's competition Alex Schwazer had again tested positive to a banned substance. He has since announced at a press conference that he had not taken anabolic steroids, despite his sample from January 1, testing positive on May 12. On 11 August 2016, Schwarzer was stripped of his title and banned for 8 years, due to positive doping test.

Schedule

Medal summary

Men

Women

Open

Results

Men's 20 km

Team (Men 20 km)

Men's 10 km (Junior)

Team (Men 10 km junior)

Women's 20 km

Team (Women 20 km)

Women's 10 km (Junior)

Team (Women 10 km junior)

Open 50 km

Team (Open 50 km)

Medal table

Note: Totals include both individual and team medals, with medals in the team competition counting as one medal.

Participation
According to an unofficial count, 398 athletes from 55 countries participated.

 (16)
 (9)
 (1)
 (7)
 (9)
 (4)
 (2)
 (21)
 (18)
 (2)
 (6)
 (14)
 (2)
 (4)
 (7)
 (16)
 (1)
 (8)
 (7)
 (7)
 (1)
 (1)
 (3)
 (10)
 (2)
 (4)
 (21)
 (14)
 (7)
 (6)
 (7)
 (1)
 (4)
 (2)
 (1)
 (9)
 (16)
 (10)
 (1)
 (9)
 (2)
 (4)
 (1)
 (8)
 (1)
 (4)
 (6)
 (21)
 (3)
 (4)
 (4)
 (7)
 (21)
 (20)
 (2)

Notes

References

External links

IAAF competition page

World Athletics Race Walking Team Championships
World Race Walking Team Championships
International athletics competitions hosted by Italy
World Race Walking Team Championships
Sports competitions in Rome
IAAF World Race Walking Team Championships
2010s in Rome
Athletics in Rome